Daniel John Martin (born 20 August 1986) is an Irish former professional road racing cyclist, who rode professionally between 2008 and 2021 for the , ,  and  teams.

Born and raised in England, Martin represented Ireland in competition through his Irish mother. During his career, Martin participated in two Olympic Games and won stages of the 2013 Tour de France and the 2018 Tour de France. Martin also won stages at the Vuelta a España in 2011 and 2020 and the 2021 Giro d'Italia. He finished in the top 10 of six Grand Tours, three times in the Tour de France, twice in the Vuelta a España and once in the Giro d’Italia. He also won the overall classification at the 2010 Tour de Pologne and the 2013 Volta a Catalunya. In one-day races, he won the 2010 Japan Cup, the 2010 Tre Valli Varesine, the 2011 Giro di Toscana, the 2013 Liège–Bastogne–Liège, and the 2014 Giro di Lombardia.

Early life and amateur career
Martin was born on 20 August 1986 in Birmingham, England, United Kingdom. Martin is the son of Neil Martin, a former British professional cyclist, and Maria Martin (née Roche) from Ireland, the sister of 1987 Triple Crown winner, Stephen Roche, father of professional cyclist Nicolas Roche. He was born five weeks premature and suffered from asthma as a child. Martin grew up in Tamworth, Staffordshire, and was educated at St Francis of Assisi Catholic Technology College. Martin became the British under-18 national road race champion in 2004. However, in 2006, Martin decided to ride for Ireland. In 2005, he joined the French amateur team , and won the mountains classification in the Ronde de l'Isard.

Professional career

Slipstream–Chipotle (2008–15)

Early years
In 2008, he won the Route du Sud and the Irish National Road Race Championships. In 2009, Martin reached a UCI World Rankings of thirty-fifth (137 points), and rode his first Grand Tour, the 2009 Vuelta a España. In 2010, he won his first UCI ProTour stage race, the Tour of Poland. He finished forty-ninth in the 2010 UCI World Rankings (106 points); Ireland placed seventeenth in the national rankings (254 points).

2011

2011 was Martin's break-out season. He won his first Grand Tour stage during the Vuelta a España, and became the first Irishman to hold the mountains classification; he wore the mountains jersey for stages ten and eleven. With a second place, behind 's Oliver Zaugg of Switzerland, in the season-ending Giro di Lombardia, Martin finished in ninth in the UCI World Rankings (286 points); Ireland placed thirteenth in the national rankings (319 points).

2012
Whilst achieving no wins in 2012, Martin placed sixteenth in UCI World Ranking (196 points); Ireland finished sixteenth in the national rankings (259 points).

2013

In March 2013, Martin won Stage 4 of the Volta a Catalunya; his fourth World Tour victory. Martin gained the leader's jersey the following day, and won overall classification four days later. In April, Martin finished fourth in La Flèche Wallonne; the following weekend, he won Liège–Bastogne–Liège, beating 's Joaquim Rodríguez of Spain. It was during the final stages of this race that a spectator in a panda suit chased the riders, leading to a long-lasting connection between Martin and the panda. Martin's form continued at the Tour de Suisse where he placed eighth overall.

Martin, along with his teammates Andrew Talansky and Ryder Hesjedal, rode the Tour de France as co-captains. On Stage 8, finishing at Ax 3 Domaines, Talansky and Martin finished together, twelfth and thirtieth, respectively, to sit twelfth and thirteenth overall. The following day, Martin won Stage 9 in Bagnères-de-Bigorre, after escaping from the lead group with Dane Jakob Fuglsang on the final climb. He out sprinted Fuglsang in the final kilometre to win the stage. Martin moved up to eighth overall in the process. However, Martin fell ill in the final week, and following the final three mountain stages, slipped to thirty-third overall.

Martin completed the 2013 season with a fourth-place finish in the Giro di Lombardia, and a second-place finish in the Tour of Beijing. Martin finished sixth in the UCI World Rankings (432 points); Ireland placed tenth in the national rankings (568 points).

2014
Martin finished second in La Flèche Wallonne, behind Spaniard Alejandro Valverde. Martin looked well positioned in Liège–Bastogne–Liège, sitting in second place, but in the final  he crashed; Australian Simon Gerrans was victorious. Martin's primary focus was the Giro d'Italia, which started in Belfast. However, in the opening team time trial, Martin crashed, breaking his collarbone; he subsequently abandoned the race. He skipped the Tour de France to focus on the Vuelta a España; he placed seventh overall. In October, Martin won the Giro di Lombardia; he attacked in the final kilometre, and soloed to the finish, winning by one second. Martin won Stage 4, and placed second overall, behind 's Philippe Gilbert of Belgium, at the season-ending Tour of Beijing. Martin finished ninth in the UCI World Rankings (316 points); Ireland placed fourteenth in the national rankings (357 points).

2015
In March, Martin came in tenth position at the Volta a Catalunya. He participated in Liège–Bastogne–Liège, but was caught in a pile-up and had to abandon all hopes of winning the race. He participated in the Tour de Romandie (finishing 104th) where he complained of chest pain, but only after the race was it found that he had two broken ribs, a result of his crash at Liège–Bastogne–Liège. On Stage 11 of the Tour de France, Martin rode across a three-minute gap on the Col d'Aspin to the breakaway, and then led over the top of the climb. However Rafał Majka, part of the breakaway, attacked the group on the Col du Tourmalet; Martin went over the climb in third place, and he rode with Emanuel Buchmann for a while before going solo to catch Majka. He passed Serge Pauwels but he could not quite get to Majka, but he did win the Combativity award for the stage.

Etixx–Quick-Step (2016–17)

2016
Martin joined  on a two-year contract from 2016, with a focus on strengthening the team's squad for the Ardennes classics and competing as a contender in stage races. Martin enjoyed success in his first race with his new team, winning the second stage of the Volta a la Comunitat Valenciana, his first win for over a year. He took another win against a strong field in the Volta a Catalunya, going on to finish third overall. He went on to Belgium to race in the Ardennes classics, where his best result was a third place at La Flèche Wallonne.

2017

Martin's first significant result of the season was a stage win at the Volta ao Algarve. In April, he placed second to Alejandro Valverde in both La Flèche Wallonne and Liège–Bastogne–Liège. In June, his late attack in the final stage lifted him to the podium, in third place, of the Critérium du Dauphiné, overtaking Chris Froome by a single second.

In the Tour de France, Martin was involved in a crash with Richie Porte in stage 9. In an interview at the end of the stage he said;

Despite back pain, finding it hard to walk and not being able to get out of his saddle at times, he went on to finish the race sixth in the general classification, only learning afterwards that he had fractured two vertebrae in the crash. The injury forced him to miss the Clásica de San Sebastián.

UAE Team Emirates (2018–19)

2018

In August 2017, Martin announced that he was joining , on a two-year contract, for the 2018 season. Martin placed fourth on stage 2 of the Volta ao Algarve, by losing out on a sprint finish to Michał Kwiatkowski; he went on to finish 14th overall.

At Paris–Nice, Martin abandoned the race due to bad weather conditions and illness on Stage 7, Martin had lost time on the previous stage due to a mechanical problem with his bike. At the Volta a Catalunya Martin fell behind on Stage 4 to La Molina, finishing 1 minute 29 seconds behind stage winner Alejandro Valverde, in 19th place. He took his first win of the season with a stage win at the Critérium du Dauphiné. On 12 July Martin won his second Tour de France stage, winning stage 6 at Mûr-de-Bretagne. He was named the most combative rider of the Tour de France.

Israel Start-Up Nation (2020–21)
In 2020 Martin joined  on a two-year contract.

In 2020 Martin took 5th place in La Flèche Wallonne, and in the Vuelta a España he finished third in each of the first two stages, followed by a win on stage three before eventually finishing fourth in the General classification.

On 26 May 2021, he won stage 17 of the 2021 Giro d'Italia, thus claiming a stage win in all three of grand tours. He eventually finished the Giro in 10th Overall.

In September 2021, Martin announced that he would retire from competition at the end of the season.

Personal
Martin holds both British and Irish citizenship. After turning professional, Martin resided in Girona, Catalonia, Spain before moving to Andorra in 2014. He is married to British distance runner Jess Martin.
In September 2018 their twin girls, Daisy and Ella Martin, were born.

Major results

2004
 1st  Road race, British National Junior Road Championships
 1st  Overall Junior Tour of Wales
2005
 9th Overall Ronde de l'Isard
2006
 2nd Road race, National Under-23 Road Championships
 2nd Overall Giro della Valle d'Aosta
1st Stage 6 (ITT)
 6th Trofeo Internazionale Bastianelli
 8th Overall Ronde de l'Isard
2007
 1st  Overall Tour des Pays de Savoie
1st Stage 4
 4th Overall Ronde de l'Isard
 5th Overall Giro della Valle d'Aosta
1st  Points classification
1st Stage 2
 9th Trofeo Internazionale Bastianelli
2008
 National Road Championships
1st  Road race
1st  Under-23 road race
 1st  Overall Route du Sud
 4th Overall Tour of Britain
 6th Route Adélie de Vitré
 8th Overall GP CTT Correios de Portugal
 10th Overall Volta a Portugal
2009
 2nd Overall Volta a Catalunya
 3rd Overall Tour Méditerranéen
1st  Young rider classification
 5th GP Ouest–France
 8th Giro di Lombardia
2010
 1st  Overall Tour de Pologne
1st Stage 5
 1st Tre Valli Varesine
 1st Japan Cup
 Tour Series Ireland, Dublin
1st Criterium
1st Sprints
 2nd Giro dell'Emilia
 3rd Road race, National Road Championships
 3rd Overall Brixia Tour
2011
 1st Giro di Toscana
 1st Stage 9 Vuelta a España
 2nd Road race, National Road Championships
 2nd Overall Volta a Catalunya
 2nd Overall Tour de Pologne
1st Stage 6
 2nd Giro di Lombardia
 3rd Memorial Marco Pantani
 8th UCI World Tour
2012
 2nd Japan Cup
 4th Overall Tour of Beijing
1st  Mountains classification
 4th Overall Volta a Catalunya
 5th Liège–Bastogne–Liège
 6th La Flèche Wallonne
2013
 1st  Overall Volta a Catalunya
1st Stage 4
 1st Liège–Bastogne–Liège
 1st Stage 9 Tour de France
 2nd Overall Tour of Beijing
 4th Giro di Lombardia
 4th La Flèche Wallonne
 6th UCI World Tour
 8th Overall Tour de Suisse
2014
 1st Giro di Lombardia
 2nd Overall Tour of Beijing
1st Stage 4
 2nd La Flèche Wallonne
 3rd Overall Tour de l'Ain
 7th Overall Vuelta a España
 9th UCI World Tour
2015
 7th Overall Critérium du Dauphiné
 7th Clásica de San Sebastián
 10th Overall Volta a Catalunya
2016
 1st Stage 2 Volta a la Comunitat Valenciana
 3rd Overall Volta a Catalunya
1st Stage 3
 3rd Overall Critérium du Dauphiné
 3rd La Flèche Wallonne
 9th Overall Tour de France
 10th UCI World Tour
2017
 2nd Liège–Bastogne–Liège
 2nd La Flèche Wallonne
 3rd Overall Paris–Nice
 3rd Overall Critérium du Dauphiné
 5th Overall Volta a la Comunitat Valenciana
 6th Overall Tour de France
 6th Overall Volta ao Algarve
1st Stage 2
 6th Overall Volta a Catalunya
 8th UCI World Tour
2018
 4th Overall Critérium du Dauphiné
1st Stage 5
 8th Overall Tour de France
1st Stage 6
 Combativity award Overall
 9th Giro di Lombardia
 10th Overall Tour de Romandie
2019
 2nd Overall Tour of the Basque Country
 4th Overall Volta a la Comunitat Valenciana
 5th Gran Piemonte
 7th Overall UAE Tour
 8th Overall Critérium du Dauphiné
2020
 4th Overall Vuelta a España
1st Stage 3
 4th Overall Volta a la Comunitat Valenciana
 5th La Flèche Wallonne
2021
 6th Giro dell'Emilia
 7th Overall Tour of Britain
 10th Overall Giro d'Italia
1st Stage 17

General classification results timeline

Classics results timeline

References

External links

 
 

1986 births
2013 Tour de France stage winners
Cyclists at the 2012 Summer Olympics
Cyclists at the 2016 Summer Olympics
Cyclists at the 2020 Summer Olympics
English male cyclists
Irish male cyclists
Irish Tour de France stage winners
Irish Vuelta a España stage winners
Irish Giro d'Italia stage winners
Living people
Olympic cyclists of Ireland
Sportspeople from Birmingham, West Midlands